Mark Herman (born 1954) is an English film director and screenwriter, best known for writing and directing the 2008 film The Boy in the Striped Pyjamas.

Life and career
Herman was born in Bridlington, East Riding of Yorkshire, England. He was educated at Woodleigh School, North Yorkshire and thereafter at Sedbergh School and Bridlington Grammar School, Bridlington. Aged 27, he was late entering the film industry, studying Art at Hull Art College before taking up animation at Leeds Polytechnic, now Leeds Beckett University, from where he progressed to the National Film and Television School.

There, he moved away from animation and towards writing and directing. He also wrote lyrics for the successful 1980s band The Christians on their first album, The Christians, alongside fellow East Riding of Yorkshire songwriter Henry Priestman.

Herman’s first feature-length project was Blame It on the Bellboy (1992), a comedy of mistaken identity starring Dudley Moore and Bryan Brown.

Next, Herman wrote and directed the critically acclaimed Brassed Off (1996), following the members of a colliery brass band, still struggling to survive a decade after the miners' strike.

In Little Voice (1998), adapted by Herman from Jim Cartwright's play The Rise and Fall of Little Voice, Jane Horrocks reprises the title role of a harried young woman whose only escape lies in the memory of her father and in imitating the singers he admired.

Purely Belter (2000), adapted by Herman from Jonathan Tulloch's novel The Season Ticket, is the story of two teenage boys trying to get together enough money for a couple of Newcastle United F.C. season tickets. Hope Springs (2003), is an adaptation of New Cardiff.

His most recent work is the adaptation of The Boy in the Striped Pyjamas. It was produced by David Heyman and stars David Thewlis, Vera Farmiga, Sheila Hancock and Rupert Friend. Herman directed and adapted the work.

Herman is a fellow of Film and Television Production at York St John University, York, England, and has received Honorary Doctorates from Hull University and Leeds Beckett University.

Jessica Winter in The Rough Guide to Film criticises Herman's fondness for "cloying" close-ups and "contrived melodramatic showdown[s]", saying of the film Purely Belter that it "probably didn't create many new converts to Herman's partly gritty, party feel-good socialist realist strain of filmmaking".

Filmography 
See You at Wembley, Frankie Walsh (1987) – a comedy based around the wedding of a Hull City fan; won a Student Academy Award in 1987.
Unusual Ground Floor Conversion (1987)
Blame It on the Bellboy (1992)
Brassed Off (1996)
Little Voice (1998)
Purely Belter (2000)
Hope Springs (2003)
The Boy in the Striped Pyjamas (2008)

References

1954 births
Living people
English film directors
English dramatists and playwrights
People from Bridlington
Alumni of the Northern Film School
Alumni of the National Film and Television School
English male dramatists and playwrights